Paul Peterson is an American curler.

At the national level, he is a 1997 United States men's champion curler.

Teams

References

External links

Living people
Sportspeople from North Dakota
American male curlers
American curling champions
Year of birth missing (living people)
Place of birth missing (living people)